The Tweed Heads Seagulls, often referred to simply as Tweed or Seagulls or Tweed Seagulls, is a rugby league club based in Tweed Heads, New South Wales. It is one of only two non-Queensland teams to play in the Queensland Cup, along with the PNG Hunters.

History

Union beginnings
Seagulls Football Club was established in 1908 and began competing in the Tweed District Rugby Union competition in 1909. Land located in the west of Tweed-Heads was purchased where the stadium and clubhouse were built in 1972. The Seagulls played their home games at Tweed Heads Recreation Ground. Coach Mick McGrath decided to name the team the Tweed Heads Seagulls. The club claimed their first rugby union premiership in 1912 and went back-to-back in 1913.

Entry into the NSWRL
In 1990 the Seagulls Leagues club bought out the New South Wales Rugby League licence for the Gold Coast-Tweed Giants, and renamed the club the Gold Coast Seagulls, although it continued to play its home games in the New South Wales town of Tweed Heads. The club played their home games at Seagulls Stadium. In 1990, the Seagulls pulled off a major coup when they signed future Rugby League Immortal Wally Lewis. In 1995 the club sold its licence to businessmen Jeff Muller, who changed the club's name to Gold Coast Gladiators.

Relegation to Gold Coast Group 18
The Tweed Heads Seagulls joined the Gold Coast Group 18 Rugby League competition in 1996.

Queensland Cup
In 2007 they were Intrust Super Cup Premiers.

2022 QLD Cup Squad 

Abele Atunaisa
Brent Barnes
Brian Kelly
Brogan Melrose
Caleb Hodges
Craig McKenzie
Daniel Ross
Ioane Seiuli
Jaline Graham
Jamayne Isaako
Jayden Campbell
Jaylan To'o
Kaleb Ngamanu
Kody Parsons
Lee Turner
Lindon McGrady
Paul Turner
Queille Murray
Ryland Jacobs
Ben Liyou
Blake Scott
Braden Robson
Brandon Russell
Brent Woolf
Charlie Murray
Craig Garvey
Harrison Muller
Jack Glossop
Jaleel Seve-Derbas
JJ Collins
Jo Vuna
Joshua Patston
Klese Haas
Lamar Manuel-Liolevave
Luke Burton
Matthew Koellner
Rei Rei Marsh
Reuben Porter
Ryan Foran

Home ground
Tweed Heads originally played out of Seagulls Stadium on Gollan Drive, West Tweed Heads. However, due to financial trouble, the club sold the ground in the late 1990s and the stadium was demolished. Currently, Tweed play their Queensland Cup games nearby at the Piggabeen Sports Complex.

Honours
Queensland Cup
 Premiers: - (2007)
 Runners-Up: - (2011)
 Minor Premierships - (2011)

See also

National Rugby League reserves affiliations

References

External links

QRL Profile

 
Sport in Tweed Heads, New South Wales
Rugby league teams in New South Wales
Rugby league teams on the Gold Coast, Queensland
Rugby clubs established in 1909
1909 establishments in Australia